Guillermo Gonzalez may refer to:

Guillermo Gonzalez (soccer) (born 1986), American soccer player
Guillermo Gonzalez (astronomer) (born 1963), Cuban astrophysicist and promoter of intelligent design
Guillermo González Camarena (1917–1965), Mexican engineer who was an inventor of modern color television
Guillermo González (athlete) (born 1950), Dominican athlete
Guillermo Gonzalez (pianist), Spanish classical pianist
Guillermo González del Río García (1912–1984), Spanish footballer
Guillermo González (politician), Colombian politician

See also
Guillermo Gonzales (born 1976), Italian singer, songwriter and musician
Guillermo Gozálvez (born 2003), Argentine footballer